Laisant is a surname. Notable people with the surname include:

Albert Laisant, French writer
Charles-Ange Laisant (1841–1920), French politician and mathematician
Maurice Laisant (1909–1991), French militant anarchist individualist, free thinker, and pacifist

See also
Laisant's Recurrence Formula